Pedro Augusto Goulart Da Rosa (born 29 August 1997) is a Mexican footballer who plays as a forward for Cimarrones de Sonora.

Career
Born in Brazil, Goulart moved to Mexico at the age of five. He has played for the Mexican under-18 and under-20 national teams.

References

External links
 
 
 

1997 births
Living people
Association football forwards
Mexican footballers
Brazilian footballers
Club León footballers
Club Puebla players
Cimarrones de Sonora players
Liga MX players
Naturalized citizens of Mexico
Mexico under-20 international footballers
Brazilian expatriate sportspeople in Mexico
Sportspeople from Santa Catarina (state)